Speed of Sound is the ninth studio album by Canadian heavy metal band Anvil, released in 1999.

Track listing

Personnel 
Anvil
 Steve "Lips" Kudlow – vocals, lead guitar
 Ivan Hurd – lead guitar
 Glenn Gyorffy – bass
 Robb Reiner – drums

Production
 Pierre Rémillard – engineer, mixing
 Alexander Krull – mastering
 Gijsbert van Frankenhuyzen – executive producer

References

1999 albums
Anvil (band) albums
Massacre Records albums